Kirston Jarre Pittman is a former American football defensive end. He was signed by the St. Louis Rams as an undrafted free agent in 2009. He played college football at Louisiana State.

Early years
As a senior at East St. John High School, Reserve, Louisiana, Pittman made 42 tackles, blocked three punts, and had one interception returned for a touchdown. As a junior, he registered 40 tackles and 12 sacks.

College career
In 2003, Pittman earned Freshmen All-SEC honors from the Sporting News and was named honorable mention Freshmen All-American by College Football News. He Played in 13 games with no starts and recorded 15 tackles and 2 sacks.

In 2004, he played 12 games with one start. He has 21 tackles (11 solo) with 5 going for a loss and three sacks. He also broke up a pass.

Pittman missed all of 2006 after tearing Achilles tendon during an offseason workout and there year before, 2005, redshirted after missing the entire season with a foot injury.

Pittman was granted a sixth year of eligibility by the NCAA due to injuries. He ended 2008 with 35 tackles (5.5 for a loss) and 2.5 sacks. In 2007, he started all 14 games and had 68 total tackles (29 solo) with 12.5 going for losses and 7.5 sacks. He also intercepted a pass and broke up one pass.

Professional career

Pre-draft

St. Louis Rams
After going undrafted in the 2009 NFL Draft, Pittman signed a two-year contract with the St. Louis Rams as an undrafted free agent. He was waived/injured on July 29 and subsequently reverted to the team's injured reserve list. He was released on August 4.

Chicago Rush
Pittman was assigned to the Chicago Rush of the Arena Football League during the 2011 season. He appeared in 3 games with the Rush, recording 3 tackles.

New Orleans VooDoo
On May 22, 2011, Pittman was traded to the New Orleans VooDoo for future considerations.

References

External links
LSU Tigers bio

1985 births
Living people
Players of American football from New Orleans
American football defensive ends
LSU Tigers football players
St. Louis Rams players
Chicago Rush players
New Orleans VooDoo players
People from Reserve, Louisiana